Sosnovka is a rural locality (a village) in Bryzgalovskoye Rural Settlement, Kameshkovsky District, Vladimir Oblast, Russia. The population was 63 as of 2010. There is 1 street.

Geography 
Sosnovka is located 15 km northeast of Kameshkovo (the district's administrative centre) by road. Malygino is the nearest rural locality.

References 

Rural localities in Kameshkovsky District